These are the Billboard Hot Dance/Disco Club Play and Maxi-Singles Sales number-one hits of 2002.

See also
2002 in music
List of number-one dance hits (United States)
List of artists who reached number one on the U.S. Dance chart

References

2002
United States Dance
2002 in American music